Michael H. Wynn, D.P.M. (born October 23, 1953) is an American podiatrist practicing in Kingwood, Texas, specializing in surgical application of lasers in the treatment of foot and ankle disorders. He has helped pioneer the treatment of bunions with the carbon dioxide laser.

Early life

Michael Wynn was born on October 23, 1953, in Evergreen, Illinois to Joseph Michael Wynn and Patricia Ann Buckentin Wynn. He has one sister, Patsy Ann Wynn. He and his sister attended Dawes Grade School in Chicago, Illinois.

In 1967, the family moved to Lockport, Illinois. He graduated from Lockport High School in 1972. At Lockport, he participated in football, track, and theatre. While in high school he also worked as a gas station attendant, busboy, and lifeguard at a lake in Romeoville, Illinois.

Education

He attended Lewis University from 1972 to 1976 concentrating in Pre-Med studies and graduated with a Bachelor of Arts with a double major in biology and chemistry.
 
Prior to graduate school, Michael worked at Arno Tape managed by the Dr. Scholl's Company in Michigan City, Indiana. While in Michigan City, he served on the EPA (Environmental Protection Agency) board for the city.

He entered the Ohio College of Podiatric Medicine in the fall of 1977. He spent most evenings and weekends working at University Hospitals as a laboratory tech in Rainbow Baby's and Children's Hospital. He graduated in 1981 with a Doctorate of Podiatric Medicine. After graduation Michael completed his surgical training in Houston, Texas in 1982.

Career
The focus of his practice has been ankle arthroscopy, endoscopic surgery, reconstructive surgery, peripheral nerve surgery, and the use of lasers in the treatment of foot and ankle disorders.

Foot and ankle laser surgery

He has been an avid proponent of furthering the use of lasers in foot and ankle surgery. Inspired by the work of Isaac Kaplan, (considered by many to be the father of laser surgery,) he studied Kaplan's research and applied it to foot and ankle surgery helping to pioneer several techniques with the  laser. He has written numerous publications on the application for their use beginning in 1986 with the publication of "Soft Tissue Bunion Repair with a  Surgical Laser" in The Journal of Current Podiatric Medicine which explains the surgical laser technique he helped develop.

In 1991, he was a contributor and developer of the  Laser WaveGuide Delivery system for arthroscopic surgical treatment of the ankle preparing it for FDA clearance.

In 1985 and 1986, he served as a lecturer and instructor for the Houston Laser Institute, training physicians across the country. He is the current Clinical Liaison at the Kingwood Medical Center Podiatric Surgical Residency, for the Greater Texas Education Foundation.

Positions
 Chairman Credentials Committee – 1986–1987 – International Society of Podiatric Laser Surgery
 board of directors – 1987–1988 – International Society of Podiatric Laser Surgery
 Chief of Surgery Elect – 1996–1997 – Northeast Medical Center
 Chief of Surgery – 1997–1998 – Northeast Medical Center
 Medical Examiner – 1999–2001 – Texas State Board of Podiatry
 Director of Education and Research, Gulf Coast Podiatric Surgical Residency, 2000–2002
 Chief of Surgery – 2001–2002 – Cleveland Regional Medical Center
 Chief of Surgery – 2007–2008 – Doctors Diagnostic Hospital
 board of directors – 2005–2009 – Doctors Diagnostic Hospital
 Surgical Instructor – 2009–present – Kingwood Medical Center Podiatric Surgical Residency, and Clinical Liaison to the Greater Texas Education Foundation, Houston, Texas

Certifications and training

 Diplomat, American Board of Podiatric Surgery, Board Certified in Foot and Ankle Surgery – 1987
 Fellow, American College of Foot and Ankle Surgeons – 1987
 Fellow, International Society of Podiatric Laser Surgery – 1993
 Hyperbaric Oxygen Certification – 1996
 Diplomat, International Society of Podiatric Laser Surgery – 1994
 Advanced Peripheral Nerve Surgery, Association of Extremity Nerve Surgeons, September 2009
 Microsurgical Training, Mayo Clinic, August 2011

Publications

 Nitrous Oxide Induced Myeloneurapathy– 1983, The Journal of Foot Surgery 
 Laser as a Light Scalpel – 1987
 Soft Tissue Bunion Repair with a  Surgical Laser – 1986
  Surgical Laser Excision of Interdigital Neuroma – 1991 
 Malignancy and Pedal Gangrene – 1996, Journal of the American Podiatric Association 
  Lasers on Osseous Tissue, Chapter in Textbook. "Laser Surgery of the Foot" - 1989

Recognition and awards
 Podiatrist of the Quarter

See also 
 What is Podiatry?

References

American podiatrists
Living people
1953 births
People from Evergreen Park, Illinois
People from Kingwood, Texas
Lewis University alumni